Alexander Ludwig (born 1992) is a Canadian actor.

Alexander Ludwig may also refer to:
 Alexander Ludwig (footballer, born 1984), German footballer
 Alexander Ludwig (footballer, born 1993), Danish footballer